Members of the Monoblepharidomycetes have a filamentous thallus that is either extensive or simple and unbranched. They frequently have a holdfast at the base. In contrast to other taxa in their phylum, some reproduce using autospores, although many do so through zoospores. Oogamous sexual reproduction may also occur.

In addition to the type genus, the order Monoblepharidales includes Harpochytrium and Oedogoniomyces.

Taxonomy
Based on the work of "The Mycota: A Comprehensive Treatise on Fungi as Experimental Systems for Basic and Applied Research" and synonyms from "Part 1- Virae, Prokarya, Protists, Fungi".
 Class Monoblepharidomycetes Schaffner 1909
 Order Harpochytriales Emerson & Whisler 1968
 Family Oedogoniomycetaceae Barr 1990
 Genus Oedogoniomyces Kobayasi & Ôkubo 1954
 Family Harpochytriaceae Emerson & Whisler 1984
 Genus Harpochytrium Lagerheim 1890 [Fulminaria Gobi 1900; Rhabdium Dangeard 1903 non Wallroth 1833]
 Order Monoblepharidales Schröter 1883
 Family Monoblepharidaceae Fischer 1892
 Genus Monoblepharis Cornu 1871 [Diblepharis Lagerheim 1900; Monoblephariopsis Laibach 1927]
 Family Gonapodyaceae Petersen 1909
 Genus Gonapodya Fischer 1892
 Genus Monoblepharella Sparrow 1940
Family Telasphaerulaceae  Longcore et T.Y. James  2017 
Genus Telasphaerula  Longcore et T.Y. James  2017 
Family Sanchytriaceae  Karpov et Aleoshin 
Genus Sanchytrium  Karpov et Aleoshin

References

Chytridiomycota